The Cape Editions are a selection of short books, frequently in translation, issued by UK publisher Jonathan Cape from 1967 to 1971.

The collection has been described as "the remarkable Cape Editions series of seminal modern texts: poetry, prose, anthropology, drama, many of them pioneering translations".

The general editor of the series was professor and poet Nathaniel Tarn.

Cape Editions

Later additions

Sources
A listing of the titles appears in The Death of Lysanda, Yitzhak Orpaz (p. 110).

References

Lists of books
Jonathan Cape books